Yuquan Temple or Jade Spring Temple may refer to these temples:

Yuquan Temple (Dangyang), Buddhist temple in Dangyang, Hubei, China
Yuquan Temple (Changsha), Buddhist temple in Changsha, Hunan, China

See also
Gyokusen-ji, Buddhist temple in Shimoda, Shizuoka Prefecture, Japan 

Buddhist temple disambiguation pages